Senator Barlow

Boce W. Barlow Jr. (1915–2005), Connecticut State Senate
Bradley Barlow (1814–1889), Vermont State Senate
Haven J. Barlow (born 1922), Utah State Senate
Stephen Steele Barlow (1818–1900), Wisconsin State Senate
Thomas Barlow (New York politician) (1805–1896), New York State Senate